Northern Rescue is a Canadian drama television series produced by Don Carmody Television (DCTV), distributed by CBC Television in Canada and internationally on Netflix. The first season of 10 episodes debuted on March 1, 2019. It stars William Baldwin as a search and rescue commander who, after the death of his wife, relocates from Boston with his three children to live with his sister-in-law in the fictional small town of Turtle Island Bay, Ontario, where he grew up.

Premise

After his wife dies, search and rescue commander John West uproots his three children, moving from Boston to his rural hometown of Turtle Island Bay. The death affects each of their lives as John and his kids cope with their loss.

Cast
William Baldwin as John West
Kathleen Robertson as Charlie Anders, Sarah's sister
Michelle Nolden as Sarah West, John's deceased wife (narrates her diary and seen in memories)
Amalia Williamson as Madelyn "Maddie" West, Sarah's oldest birth child
Spencer MacPherson as Scout West, John and Sarah's only son
Taylor Thorne as Taylor West, John and Sarah's youngest child
Sebastien Roberts as Alex, Charlie's estranged boyfriend
Evan Marsh as Henry, Maddie's budding love interest
 Eliana Jones as Gwen, friend of Maddie and Henry

Episodes

Production
The show is produced in Ontario by Don Carmody Television (DCTV). It is streamed in Canada on CBC Television's CBC Gem service and distributed internationally on Netflix. The first season of 10 episodes debuted on both services on March 1, 2019. Northern Rescue was filmed in Parry Sound, a town in Ontario, and in Toronto, Canada.

References

External links
 

2010s Canadian drama television series
2019 Canadian television series debuts
CBC Television original programming
English-language Netflix original programming
Television series about families
Television shows set in Ontario